The pro-Republic of China camp, or the pro-Kuomintang camp, is a political alignment in Hong Kong. It generally pledges allegiance to the Republic of China (ROC) in Taiwan and the Kuomintang (Chinese Nationalist Party).

The pro-ROC camp were called "Rightists" and was one of the two major political forces in Hong Kong during the first decades of the post-war period of the British colony of Hong Kong. The pro-ROC camp, who competed with the pro-Communist "Leftists", has gradually declined in numbers after the Republic of China's departure from the United Nations in 1971 and the signing of the Sino-British Joint Declaration in 1984 which decided Hong Kong's sovereignty to be handed over to the People's Republic of China (PRC). Today, it is generally aligned with the pro-democracy camp in Hong Kong and the Pan-Blue Coalition in Taiwan led by the Kuomintang.

The pro-ROC camp closely follows the Kuomintang's doctrines, including Sun Yat-sen's Three Principles of the People and the 1992 Consensus of Cross-Strait relations. It opposes Taiwan independence and also supports universal suffrage in Hong Kong. The only elected representative of the pro-ROC camp is the Democratic Alliance, of which party chairman Johnny Mak and Shek King-ching occupy seats in the Yuen Long District Council.

History

Pre-war period
The support base of the Chinese Nationalist Party (Kuomintang) has existed even before the founding of the Republic of China (ROC), as its founding father Sun Yat-sen was a medical student in British Hong Kong in the late 19th century and set up anti-Qing revolutionary organisations in Hong Kong. After the founding of the Republic, Hong Kong pro-Nationalist forces remained their close contact with the Nationalist revolutionary government in Canton. With the Canton's support, the pro-Nationalists and pro-Communists launched the 1922 Hong Kong Seamens' Strike and 1925 Canton–Hong Kong General Strike. In 1927, the pro-Nationalists gained their status as the Nationalist Party became the official government in China until 1949.

Early post-war period

The Chinese Civil War saw the influx of pro-Kuomintang refugees and former soldiers to Hong Kong who were driven from their homeland by the Communists, and they first settled at refugee centers in Kai Lung Wan. After years of exile and grinding poverty, many of them were steeped in bitterness and yearning for revenge against the Communists. The pro-Kuomintang triad members played a key part in the Double Ten riots, which was escalated from provocations between pro-Nationalist and pro-Communist factions in 1956. A government official ordered that Republic of China flags be removed from the Lei Cheng Uk estate, eventually leading to the riots. After the riots ended, the colonial government decided to move the Nationalists to a more remote spot. This became the most iconic pro-Nationalist neighbourhood Rennie's Mill, which was a Nationalist enclave in the colony until it was redeveloped into the Tseung Kwan O New Town in the 1990s on the eve of the Communist takeover of Hong Kong.

The KMT also subsidized schools in Hong Kong via the Overseas Chinese Affairs Commission, such as the Hong Kong Tak Ming College and Chu Hai College of Higher Education. The British government in Hong Kong did not recognize Chu Hai College's accreditation, so it was instead registered under the Republic of China's Ministry of Education, giving it recognition as if the school were located in Taiwan.

Some Hong Kong newspapers advertised joining the KMT military, and a number of Hong Kong residents signed up and defended Kinmen Island in 1958. Some of these members returned to Hong Kong and joined the Republic of China Veterans' Association, where they gathered at the Red House every National Day.

The political scene in Hong Kong was split into pro-Nationalist and pro-Communist factions in the first decades of the post-war Hong Kong, of which both camps controlled various sectors from labour unions, schools, media to film companies. The largest pro-Nationalist trade unions was the Hong Kong and Kowloon Trades Union Council (TUC) established in 1948, which was the main rival of the pro-Communist Hong Kong and Kowloon Federation of Trade Unions (FTU). The pro-Nationalist forces also owned the Hong Kong Times which was founded in 1949 with an anti-communist stance and was regarded as a Kuomintang party organ. Many major newspapers at that time were also generally pro-Nationalist, such as the Kung Sheung Daily News, Wah Kiu Yat Pao and the Sing Tao Daily which used the Minguo calendar until the 1980s or 90s.

Long decline

After the Republic of China's departure from the United Nations, the Taipei government lost a great prestige in the Chinese community. The pro-Nationalist forces also suffered a decline. The signing of the Sino-British Joint Declaration in 1984, which decided Hong Kong's sovereignty to be handed over to the People's Republic of China (PRC), also resulted in diminished numbers of the pro-Taiwan forces. In the 1990s, it saw the two pro-Kuomintang newspapers Hong Kong Times and Hong Kong United Daily closed. The right-leaning Sing Tao Daily also could not be classified as a rightist paper anymore after a political metamorphosis.

The pro-Kuomintang camp also tried to participate in the elections as the colonial government introduced representative democracy in the 1980s but could hardly launch an effective campaign. In 1985, it saw the TUC representative Pang Chun-hoi occupy a seat in the Labour functional constituency along with FTU representative Tam Yiu-chung in the first elected Legislative Council of Hong Kong. Pang was generally aligned with the liberal cause in the legislature and served for three terms until he stepped down in 1995.

In 1994, the pro-Nationalists founded a political party 123 Democratic Alliance to contest in the 1995 first full Legislative Council election. Yum Sin-ling, the leader of the alliance won a seat through an Election Committee composing of District Board members in the last colonial Legislative Council on the eve of the handover.

Since 1997, the pro-Nationalist group has become a small faction within the pro-democracy camp. The Democratic Alliance led by Johnny Mak was founded in 2003 and cooperates with pro-democrat legislator Albert Chan in the 2003 District Council election. It was briefly affiliated with the radical democratic party People Power between 2011 and 2012. The other currently active pro-Taiwan political groups include the China Youth Service & Recreation Centre.

Political parties
 Democratic Alliance (DA), a small political party chaired by Johnny Mak. It also aligns itself with the pro-democracy camp. It held two seats on the Yuen Long District Council until 2021 and is the only member of the camp to have elected members since the handover.
 Hong Kong and Kowloon Trades Union Council (TUC), the third-largest trade union in Hong Kong chaired by Lee Kwok-keung. It previously held one of two seats of the Labour functional constituency from 1985 to 1995.

Notable pro-Taiwan organizations
 China Youth Service & Recreation Centre
 Hong Kong Chung Shan Research Institute (港澳中山文教研究總會, Kuomintang Branch in Hong Kong and Macau)

Notable former pro-ROC organizations
 123 Democratic Alliance (dissolved)
 Hong Kong Times (closed)
 Hong Kong United Daily (closed)
 Kung Sheung Daily News (closed)
 Sing Tao Daily (switched side to pro-Beijing camp after 1997 Britain handover to China)
 Wah Kiu Yat Pao (closed)

See also
 Hong Kong–Taiwan relations
 Pan-Blue Coalition
 Pro-Beijing camp
 Pan-democracy camp

References

External links
 Hong Kong’s ‘pro-Taiwan’ camp: From Kuomintang exiles to conservers of Sun Yat-sen’s heritage

 
 
Hong Kong–Taiwan relations
Political party alliances in Hong Kong
Politics of Hong Kong
Three Principles of the People